Radia Bent Lhoucine (1912–1994) was a self-taught Moroccan artist who began painting in her later years, and whose work has been exhibited and sold at galleries in Africa and Europe.

Life and work 
Radia Bent Lhoucine (also spelled Radia Bent El Houssein) was born in the region of Marrakech in Douar Oulad Youssef (in the province of Kalaât Sraghna) and died in 1994 in Salé, Morocco. She didn't begin painting until 1961; even then it was rare for Moroccan women to pursue art.

After seeing the artwork created by her son, the painter Miloud Labied, she was inspired to take up painting in spite of her age, over fifty years old. Encouraged by her son, she exhibited some of her work in the studio of Jacqueline Brodskis in Rabat, Morocco, in 1962. Her paintings were well received by critics who categorized her work as Naive art. Her paintings have often been discussed, and exhibited, with those of two of her contemporaries Chaibia Talal (1929–2004) and Fatima Hassan El Farrouj (1945–2011). 

She was featured in the exhibition titled Two thousand years of Art in Morocco held at the Charpentier Gallery in Paris in 1963. She also exhibited that same year at the Jean Dubuffet Foundation in Lausanne, Switzerland. Then her work was shown at the Bab Rouah Gallery in Rabat in 1966 with other female Moroccan painters.

She participated in numerous other exhibitions in Morocco and abroad and her works appeared in various collections around the world, in particular, that of Société Générale Maroc in Casablanca, that of the Villa des Arts Galerie and the Museum of Contemporary Art of the ONA foundation and in various private collections in Morocco and Switzerland.

Radia Bent Lhoucine stopped painting by the end of the 1970s. She died in 1994 in Salé and her personal collection of art was sent to her son, Labied.

Legacy 
She has been called one of the "three pioneering artists who have marked the history of Moroccan art," and a description of a 2011 exhibition at Casablanca's Gallery 38 asserted that,This exhibition will be the opportunity to discover the dreamlike universe of Radia Bent Lhoucine, a link between rock art and popular tale: a work that relates the wild poetry of nature in its raw state, where imaginary characters and animals evolve in ultra colorful hues.As of 2020, her work was on display in the Mohammed VI Museum of Modern and Contemporary Art in Rabat.

Expositions 
 1962 - Workshop of Jacqueline Brodskis in Rabat (Morocco), individual exhibition
 1963 - Two thousand years of art in Morocco, Charpentier Gallery, Paris, collective exhibition
 1963 - Lausanne (Switzerland), individual exhibition
 1966 - Galerie Bab Rouah in Rabat with Fatéma Hassan and Hassan El Farouj
 1980 - First Meeting of Moroccan Women Painters Essaouira, collective exhibition

Posthumous exhibitions
 1995 - Regards Immortels, Société Générale Marocaine de Banque, Casablanca collective exhibition
 2006 - Regards de femmes, collective exhibition at the gallery of the headquarters of the Société Générale Marocaine de Banque, Casablanca 
 2006 - collective exhibition Fondation ONA, Villa des Arts de Casablanca, 
 2009 - Itineraries, ONA Foundation on the sidelines of the Creation Forum in Morocco, collective exhibition 
 2009 - Repères pour une histoire de la peinture au Maroc, traveling exhibition organized by different Moroccan ministries in collaboration with the Villa des Arts of ONA, the French Institute and the Goethe Institut in Rabat and financed by a Franco-German fund 
 2011 - Radia Bent Lhoucine, raw fauna and popular figures, at Galerie 38 in Casablanca

References

External links 
 Some paintings by Radia Bent Lhoucine

   

1912 births
1994 deaths
People from Marrakesh
Naïve painters
Naïve art
Moroccan women artists
Moroccan women painters
20th-century Moroccan painters
20th-century Moroccan women